Deee-Lite was an American house and dance music group formed in New York City. The group's best-known single is "Groove Is in the Heart", which was released in 1990 from their debut studio album World Clique (1990), and was a top-ten hit in multiple countries. In December 2016, Billboard ranked them as the 55th most successful dance artists of all time.

In 2018, the Netflix series Big Mouth released a Planned Parenthood- and Deee-Lite-themed episode—it is noteworthy Kier has been a longtime abortion rights advocate.

History

1986-1989: Background and early history
The band began in 1986 as a duo in New York City with Lady Miss Kier (born Kierin Magenta Kirby) primarily on vocals and Supa DJ Dmitry (born in Ukraine as Dmitry Brill) as the DJ, and then became a trio when Korean-Japanese Jungle DJ Towa Tei joined the group in 1988.

Initially, Kier and Dmitry performed their songs monthly in numerous downtown NYC nightclubs from 1986 onwards. In 1987, Kier bought the Akai S900 sampler, which influenced their sound tremendously.  She also bought a Casio FZ-series sampler, which was used almost exclusively on their first album. Indeed, sampling played such an important role that they named their production company "Sampladelic". From the band's inception, Kier designed the posters and club invites and was also the graphic designer for all three albums and 12" singles. The band played in both hip-hop and house clubs, and both gay and straight clubs, including Wigstock and opening for Native Tongue Movement's De La Soul and Jungle Brothers. As described in Rolling Stone, "they were drawing vivid, multiracial, pan-sexual crowds...". Part of the band's appeal was its inclusiveness, as noted by Mademoiselle magazine "as a group, they're a festival of individuality; as a band, they're a party anyone can attend". In these early years, their live shows garnered a steady following and attracted Towa Tei as a fan.

Thereafter, Towa sent Kier and Dmitry a bedroom DJ tape he had made and they realised he, like them, also enjoyed a fusion of funk and techno. Towa and Dmitry began jointly programming the band's computer. Although Towa did not play any instruments, he was a record collector and added samples. They invited him to join the group in 1988 and together the three produced their first album. Kier wrote all the lyrics and melodies, and also asked Bootsy Collins to join in sessions. Dmitry played guitar, keyboard, and bass, and Towa gathered samples for fill-ins and grooves. Bootsy Collins introduced them to The Horny Horns, Fred Wesley, Maceo Parker, Mudbone Cooper, and Bernie Worrell. Collins also helped assemble their touring band. Together the trio produced the first and second Deee-Lite albums under their production company Sampladelic.

1990-1997: Album releases and fame
In 1990, their first album, World Clique, shot to the top of the dance charts, and the song "Groove Is in the Heart" became their first number-one hit. The song features vocals from Q-Tip of A Tribe Called Quest as well as the famous bass guitar loop, sampled from the Herbie Hancock song "Bring Down The Birds" and additional vocals by funk musician Bootsy Collins, a fan of the group. A politically-charged second album was released following their success, titled Infinity Within in 1992. The album failed to chart as high as their debut, but they still scored two Top 40 dance hits with "Runaway" and "Pussycat Meow".

Towa ultimately did not join the other two on their world tours, for which they had a nine-piece band, as he preferred to start working on the second Deee-Lite album (Infinity Within), from the comfort of his own home where his records and samples were located. As told to MTV News, "...a reason I left Deee-Lite was that I hated the touring—playing the same songs over and over again every night," Towa said. "I'm not that type of person. I don't like being in front of the people". After extensive touring, Kier and Dmitry were not given tour funding for the second album, Infinity Within, as promised by the Warner contract. After the release of their second album, Kier and Dmitry wondered if their sound was losing touch with the dancefloor and began writing the dancefloor album Dewdrops in the Garden. At the time, the creative differences were strong between Towa and the other two members of Deee-Lite. As told to MTV News by Towa, "When I made a big decision to take a break," Towa said, "I started to listen to different types of music again—bossa nova, soundtracks. I started getting materials that went beyond the Deee-Lite concept. For me it fit, but for them it didn't really fit". Prior to the release of the group's third album, Dewdrops in the Garden, Towa abruptly left the band (appearing only on the track "Call Me") and was replaced by DJ Ani. Kier was determined to keep the band together and offered Towa to remix a song of his choice so he'd have a presence on the third Deee-Lite album. Even with a roster change and minimal record label support, Deee-Lite still managed to tour for one year after the release of the album, even selling more copies than their second release. In 1994, Kier and Dmitry's turbulent relationship came to an end and so did the group.

In total, the group scored six number-one hits on the U.S. Billboard Hot Dance Club Play chart over the five years they were together. In the years after the band's break-up, financial problems due to bad management impacted both Kier and Dmitry—however, they survived and are still in business as writers, producers and DJs. Kier is still primarily a singer, songwriter, and DJ, having traveled all over the world and performed on numerous albums with internationally acclaimed artists. She is often regarded as a style "icon" by publications such as Vogue for her distinctive style of dress and continual influence on the international fashion scene. Dmitry continued working as a DJ, from Hong Kong to Jerusalem, and from Berlin's Love Parade to Brazil's Rock In Rio. He was given a DJ of the year award in Ibiza, and has remixed for many artists including Arthur Russell, Jungle Brothers, Sinead O'Connor, Ziggy Marley, Nina Hagen, Ultra Naté, and others. He collaborated with Julee Cruise (of Twin Peaks/David Lynch fame) to release the album My Secret Life. Dmitry is currently based in Berlin where he continues to DJ, compose, produce, and re-mix. Towa Tei has recorded several albums as a solo artist, and is currently featured in Japanese supergroup METAFIVE. In a 2011 interview, Towa Tei dismissed the chances of Deee-Lite reforming, citing the creative and personal differences that prompted him to depart.

Band members 
Supa DJ Dmitry aka DJ Dmitry (Dmitry Brill, born June 4, 1964, Kyiv, Ukrainian SSR, USSR), composer, producer, keyboards, guitar
Lady Miss Kier (Kierin M. Kirby, born August 15, 1963, Youngstown, Ohio, United States), vocalist, producer, arranger, lyricist, choreographer, art director, manager
Towa Tei (born September 7, 1965, originally from Yokohama, Japan), composer, producer, keyboards, turntables, programming
DJ Ani (Ani Q. Schempf, born December 14, 1973, Kansas City, Kansas, United States), mixing, bass

Discography

Albums

Studio albums

Compilation albums

Singles

See also
List of Billboard number-one dance club songs
List of artists who reached number one on the U.S. Dance Club Songs chart

References

External links

Lady Miss Kier Official Website
Deee-Liteful Experience Deee-Lite fan site
Deee-Lite Discography at Discogs.com
MusicBlob: Archivio documenti This Italian website has archived some legal documents including the "Kirby v.Sega" case involving Lady Miss Kier of Deee-Lite
Archival copy of Kirby v. Sega appeal documents -- (musicblob.it stopped hosting this content)

 
Electronic music groups from New York (state)
American house music groups
American pop music groups
American dance music groups
Musical groups established in 1990
Musical groups disestablished in 1996
Elektra Records artists
American funk musical groups
1987 establishments in New York City